"Boy Magnet" is the second international single by Indonesian singer Agnez Mo. It was released by The Cherry Party on 13 November 2015, with five remixes of the song being available for download. The song was remixed by Hector Fonseca, John Dish, Tommy Love and Xavi Alfaro, while the original version is expected to appear on her upcoming debut international album.

Reception
In Indonesia, "Boy Magnet" remixes were only commercially released on iTunes Store and charted at number three on its chart. "Boy Magnet" make Agnez first Billboard charts the song chart in number 52 on the Billboard Dance Club Songs. Due to underwhelming response of the single, Agnez Mo's full-length international debut album—previously announced to be released in Spring 2016—was postponed. She eventually dropped out of The Cherry Party, and released her debut international album, X, in 2017.

Remixes
Digital remixes
"Boy Magnet" (John Dish Remix) – 5:26
"Boy Magnet" (Hector Fonseca Remix) – 4:17
"Boy Magnet" (Hector Fonseca & Tommy Love Radio Edit) – 3:53
"Boy Magnet" (Hector Fonseca & Tommy Love Tribal Dub) – 6:53
"Boy Magnet" (Xavi Alfaro Remix) – 6:07

Charts

References

2015 songs
2015 singles
Songs written by Makeba Riddick
Songs written by Jim Beanz